Lymantria ampla is a moth of the family Erebidae first described by Francis Walker in 1855. It is found in India and Sri Lanka.

Biology
The caterpillar is a pest of cotton, Pelargonium, Quisqualis indica, Ricinus communis, Rosa, Tectona grandis, Terminalia catappa, Terminalia paniculata, Theobroma cacao, Trewia nudiflora, Adina, Anacardium occidentale, Begonia, Cajanus cajan, Carissa carandas, Cassia fistula, Casuarina, Coffea, Crotalaria, Eucalyptus, Ficus, Ficus religiosa, Lagerstroemia indica, Lagerstroemia thorelii, Malus pumila and Mangifera indica.

Control
Caterpillars can be destroyed by introducing natural parasites: Apanteles obliquae, Brachymeria porthetrialis and Cotesia glomeratus.

Gallery

References

Lymantria
Moths of Asia
Moths described in 1855